The Château de Meung-sur-Loire is a former castle and episcopal palace in the commune of Meung-sur-Loire in the Loiret département of France.

The château, located next to the collegial church, was the country residence of the Bishops of Orléans. It was built and destroyed several times. The oldest still existing parts date from the 12th century and were built by Manassès de Seignelay (bishop from 1207 to 1221). Still standing is the main rectangular plan building, flanked by three towers, a fourth having been destroyed. The English occupied it during the Hundred Years' War. The rear façade was rebuilt in the Classical style by Fleuriau d'Armenonville (bishop from 1706 to 1733). Beneath the castle are dungeons, a chapel and various medieval torture instruments, including one used for water torture.

It has been listed since 1988 as a monument historique by the French Ministry of Culture. It is open to the public.

History
The first castle was built in the middle of the 12th century. It consisted of a square tower built against the south face of the church bell tower, itself abutting in the south two round towers. In the 13th century, the bishops of Orléans abandoned the castle, which was used as a prison. Among those incarcerated, there was the poet, François Villon. From 1209, construction began of a more important castle, rectangular in plan, with a tower in each corner. The guard room, the lower hall with ogive vaults and the cellars are the last elements which constituted the 13th-century castle, the episcopal palace at that time. During the Hundred Years' War, the building was transformed into a fortress; it was taken from the English by Joan of Arc on 14 June 1429. At the end of the 15th century and the start of the 16th century, a building to the north incorporated a tower with a drawbridge. The castle was abandoned from the Wars of Religion until the start of the 18th century when Bishop Fleuriau d'Armenonville undertook the transformation of the structure into a comfortable residence. The central part of the main building was replaced by a cour d'honneur. The façades' openings were made symmetrical and redesigned in the Classical style. Similarly, the tower openings were remade and lost their machicolation. In the middle of the 18th century, a wing was added to the south east, with a staircase serving the wing's upper floors. In 1784, the chapel was built in the Neoclassical style, with sculpture by Delaistre. The two pavilions in the grounds are contemporary with this chapel.

Currently 
In 2016, the château hosted a fashion show shortly after Paris Fashion Week, celebrating historical fashion and displaying the evolution of fashion from antiquity to the First World War.

See also
List of castles in France

References

External links
 
 History and Pictures  

Castles in Centre-Val de Loire
Loiret
Monuments historiques of Centre-Val de Loire
Episcopal palaces